Antoinette Rijpma-de Jong (born 6 April 1995) is a Dutch speed skater. She won the bronze medal in the 3000 m at the 2018 Winter Olympics in Pyeongchang, South Korea. She also competed at the 2014 Winter Olympics in Sochi, where she placed seventh in 3000 meters. She is the world record holder of 3000 meters in juniors.

Personal records

She is currently in 7th position in the adelskalender with a points total of 156.444.

World records

World records

Tournament overview

source:

References

External links

 
 

1995 births
Dutch female speed skaters
Speed skaters at the 2014 Winter Olympics
Speed skaters at the 2018 Winter Olympics
Speed skaters at the 2022 Winter Olympics
Olympic speed skaters of the Netherlands
Olympic silver medalists for the Netherlands
Olympic bronze medalists for the Netherlands
Medalists at the 2018 Winter Olympics
Medalists at the 2022 Winter Olympics
Sportspeople from Heerenveen
Living people
Olympic medalists in speed skating
World Allround Speed Skating Championships medalists
World Single Distances Speed Skating Championships medalists
21st-century Dutch women